Makenzie Leigh (born August 8, 1990) is an American actress, noted for playing the protagonist's romantic interest in Ang Lee's Billy Lynn's Long Halftime Walk (2016).

Early life
Leigh was born in Dallas, Texas on August 8, 1990.

Career
Leigh's first major role came as Liza in the first season of the Batman prequel television series Gotham (2014–2015). She was also featured in a regular role as the babysitter in the 2015 television miniseries The Slap, a remake of the Australian series of the same name.

Leigh played a supporting role opposite Christopher Abbott in the film James White (2015) and played a small part in the Amazon series Mozart in the Jungle.

Leigh had a prominent role as Dallas Cowboys Cheerleader Faison Zorn, Billy Lynn's romantic fixation, in the Ang Lee-directed film Billy Lynn's Long Halftime Walk (2016).

On August 30, 2021, it was announced that Leigh will appear as Susan Nortan in an adaptation of Stephen King's Salem's Lot for Warner Bros. Pictures and New Line Cinema.

Filmography

Film

Television

References

External links
 

1990 births
Living people
Actresses from Dallas
American film actresses
American television actresses
21st-century American women